Hydroflumethiazide (or Saluron) is a diuretic.

Synthesis

See also 
Bendroflumethiazide

References 

Diuretics
Sulfonamides
Benzothiadiazines
Trifluoromethyl compounds
Carbonic anhydrase inhibitors